P. J. Gallagher (born 18 April 1975) is an Irish stand-up comedian and actor, perhaps better known from his television show Naked Camera. His various characters in the programme include a mentally unstable taxi driver, ladies' man Jake Stevens and a "Dirty Auld One", an old woman who makes sexual comments.

Early life and career 
He is an alumnus of St Paul's College, Raheny. In , Gallagher married Elaine Stewart who was his long-term girlfriend, they are believed to have separated in 2016. He is also friends with fellow comedian Jason Byrne, and he has worked on BBC's The I Hate Show. Gallagher is also a motorbike racer. He has revealed he has reactive arthritis.

He participated in season 4 of Celebrity Bainisteoir managing St Patrick's GAA Club Donabate, Dublin.

He was in Meet Your Neighbours, when RTÉ put him on RTÉ One.

He presented PJ and Jim in the Morning with Jim McCabe on Classic Hits until April, 2021. On April 1, 2021, PJ and co-host Jim McCabe moved from Ireland's Classic Hits to Radio Nova to present the new 'Morning Glory' breakfast programme; the show is broadcast every weekday from 6am-10am. 

Starting from 21 October 2015, P.J. also presents Dubland with Suzanne Kane. The podcast has been successful reaching number 1 on the iTunes Irish comedy chart.

Filmography

Film

Television

References

Living people
Irish comedy musicians
Irish male comedians
Irish stand-up comedians
People educated at St Paul's College, Raheny
1975 births